Jalal al-Din or Jalāl ad-Dīn (Tatar: Cäläletdin; Kazakh: Jäleläddin; Polish: Dżalal ad-Din) (1380–1412) was the Khan of the Golden Horde in 1411–1412. He was the son of Tokhtamysh, Khan of the Golden Horde until 1395, by Ṭaghāy Beg Khatun, the daughter of Ḥājjī Beg. He is also famous for his written history of the Mongol Empire. He is also known as the Green Sultan, a false etymology based on the apparent meaning of a Slavic rendition of his name, Zeleni Saltan.

Life 
After being dethroned by the beglerbeg Edigu and replaced with Tīmūr-Qutluq, Tokhtamysh had attempted to regain his throne with Lithuanian aid, but was defeated in 1399. He continued his resistance from Sibir until he was killed against Edigu in 1406. Tokhtamysh's sons, including Jalāl ad-Dīn, sought refuge at the court of the Grand Prince of Moscow, Vasilij I Dmitrievič, who refused to extradite them. During Edigu's attack on Moscow, Vasilij intended to use Tokhtamysh's sons to counterattack and undermine the enemy at its capital, Sarai. Indeed, one of Tokhtamysh's sons, Karīm Berdi succeeded in briefly driving out Edigu's khan Pūlād from the city in 1409. Edigu was forced to abandon his siege of Moscow to recover control of Sarai.

Subsequently, Jalāl ad-Dīn went to Lithuania, seeking support from the Lithuanian Grand Prince Vytautas. In 1410, he fought under Vytautas in the victorious Battle of Grunwald against the Teutonic Order. Jalāl ad-Dīn commanded a Mongol unit on the right wing of the Polish-Lithuanian forces.

In unclear circumstances Jalāl ad-Dīn raided into the Golden Horde from Lithuania in 1411, killing in battle Edigu's khan, Pūlād, but was unable to establish himself in power at the time. Edigu made Pūlād's brother Tīmūr the new khan, but the latter harnessed a reaction against Edigu, causing him to flee to Khwarazm. As the new khan was preoccupied with Edigu in the east, Jalāl ad-Dīn and his brothers saw an opportunity to recover their father's throne. With Lithuanian support, the brothers raided into the Golden Horde in 1411, first seizing Crimea, then advancing on Sarai and driving out Tīmūr Khan. Jalāl ad-Dīn now became khan, and determined to eliminate Tīmūr, who had joined his own troops besieging Edigu in Khwarazm. Tīmūr commenced a march against Jalāl ad-Dīn, but saw much of his force desert to the enemy, and turned to flight. Jalāl ad-Dīn convinced Tīmūr's emir Ghāzān, married to one of Jalāl ad-Dīn's sisters, to murder the fugitive khan in late 1411 or early 1412.

Jalāl ad-Dīn rewarded Ghāzān by making him beglerbeg, and entrusted him a force to attack Edigu, whose son Sulṭān-Maḥmūd was Jalāl ad-Dīn's nephew; in exchange for Sulṭān-Maḥmūd, the new khan promised Edigu peace. Assured of Edigu's promised compliance, Ghāzān returned to the khan, who, distrusting Edigu, sent a new force against him, under Qajulay. Despite his superiority in numbers, Qajulay was defeated and killed by Edigu with a stratagem. His failure to eliminate Edigu and his son Nūr ad-Dīn notwithstanding, Jalāl ad-Dīn seemingly consolidated his position in the Golden Horde, issuing coins at (old) Astrakhan and Bolghar. He demanded that his former protector, Grand Prince Vasilij II of Moscow, cede Nižnij Novgorod back to the descendants of its ruling line, and both Vasilij of Moscow and Ivan Mihajlovič of Tver' set out for the khan's court to assuage him in person. By the time they arrived, however, Jalāl ad-Dīn was dead, before October 27, 1412.

Jalāl ad-Dīn is characterized by Muʿīn-ad-Dīn Naṭanzī as worthy, respectable, handsome, well-spoken, and given to council with worthy people. However, his good fortune and personal bravery caused him to abandon caution. This allowed him to be murdered at night on his very throne by his envious brother Sulṭān-Muḥammad. The fratricide is variously identified as Karīm Berdi or Kebek or Jabbār Berdi, each of whom reigned for a short while after Jalāl ad-Dīn; the manner of his death is also given as being killed in battle against one of his brothers, or shot with an arrow by one of his brothers during a battle against Edigu. He reigned for about a year, dying before October 27, 1412.

Descendants 
According to the Muʿizz al-ansāb, Jalāl ad-Dīn had two sons: Abū-Saʿīd and Amān-Bīk. The Tawārīḫ-i guzīdah-i nuṣrat-nāmah mentions only the first of the two.

Genealogy 
Genghis Khan
Jochi
Tuqa-Timur
Saricha
Kuyunchak
Qutluq Khwāja
Tuy Khwāja
Tokhtamysh
Jalāl ad-Dīn

References

 Gaev, A. G., "Genealogija i hronologija Džučidov," Numizmatičeskij sbornik 3 (2002) 9-55. 
 Howorth, H. H., History of the Mongols from the 9th to the 19th Century. Part II.1. London, 1880.
 Sabitov, Ž. M., Genealogija "Tore", Astana, 2008.
 Seleznëv, J. V., Èlita Zolotoj Ordy: Naučno-spravočnoe izdanie, Kazan', 2009.
 Pilipčuk, J. V., and Ž. M. Sabitov, "Bor'ba Toktamyševičej za vlast' v 10–20-h gg. XV v.," Iz istorii i kult'ury narodov Srednego Povolž'ja 6 (2016) 110-125.
 Počekaev, R. J., Cari ordynskie: Biografii hanov i pravitelej Zolotoj Ordy. Saint Petersburg, 2010.
 Reva, R., "Borba za vlast' v pervoj polovine XV v.," in Zolotaja Orda v mirovoj istorii, Kazan', 2016: 704-729.
 Vohidov, Š. H. (trans.), Istorija Kazahstana v persidskih istočnikah. 3. Muʿizz al-ansāb. Almaty, 2006.

1380 births
1412 deaths
Khans of the Golden Horde
People in the Battle of Grunwald
15th-century monarchs in Europe